Whitmoor Common is a  biological Site of Special Scientific Interest on the northern outskirts of Guildford in Surrey. It is part of the Thames Basin Heaths Special Protection Area and the  Whitmoor and Rickford Commons Local Nature Reserve, which is owned by Surrey County Council and managed by the Surrey Wildlife Trust.

This site on the heath of the London Basin has a variety of heathland habitats, as well as areas of woodland, meadow and still and running water. The heath has a nationally scarce spider, Oxyopes heterophthalmus and beetle Hyperaspis pseudopustulata and there are nationally important populations of several bird species.

The site is open to the public.

History 
The common has had many fires including August 12, 2020 April 22nd, 2019 and 21 June 2018.

References

External links 
 

Local Nature Reserves in Surrey
Surrey Wildlife Trust
Sites of Special Scientific Interest in Surrey
Special Protection Areas in England